Kalzeubet Pahimi Deubet (born 1 January 1957) is a Chadian businessman and politician who was Prime Minister of Chad from November 2013 to February 2016.

Early life and career
Deubet was the head of the state-owned cotton parastatal.

Politics
Deubet served in the government as Minister of the Civil Service and Minister of Communication. Following the resignation of Prime Minister Djimrangar Dadnadji over allegations of ordering arbitrary arrests, Deubet was appointed as Prime Minister on 21 November 2013.

Deubet resigned on 13 February 2016 and President Idriss Déby appointed Albert Pahimi Padacké to replace him.

References

1957 births
Patriotic Salvation Movement politicians
Heads of government of Chad
Living people
People from Mayo-Kebbi Ouest Region